Gladys Nataly Landaverde Hernández (born 23 February 1990 in San Ignacio, Chalatenango) is a Salvadoran middle-distance runner. At the 2012 Summer Olympics, she competed in the Women's 1500 metres.

Personal bests

Outdoor
800 m: 2:07.87 min –  Managua, 15 June 2012
1500 m: 4:18.26 min –  London, 6 August 2012

Achievements

References

External links

1990 births
Living people
Salvadoran female middle-distance runners
Olympic athletes of El Salvador
Athletes (track and field) at the 2011 Pan American Games
Athletes (track and field) at the 2012 Summer Olympics
Pan American Games competitors for El Salvador
Salvadoran female cross country runners
Central American Games silver medalists for El Salvador
Central American Games bronze medalists for El Salvador
Central American Games medalists in athletics